Undercovers is an American action spy television series created by J. J. Abrams and Josh Reims that aired NBC from September 22 to December 29, 2010. They were executive producers of the pilot along with Abrams' frequent collaborator Bryan Burk.

Because of low ratings, the show was canceled on November 4, 2010. Two episodes were unaired in the United States, but aired in Australia on January 2 and 9, 2012.

Premise
Five years after leaving the CIA to open a catering company, Steven and Samantha Bloom are recruited back into the agency by Carlton Shaw. They take on special missions the average agent cannot handle. Having made a pact to never discuss their pasts with each other, the Blooms find surprising new things about their spouse in the course of each mission. They are aided by Leo Nash, a top agent who was once Samantha's boyfriend, and geeky computer expert Bill Hoyt, who worships Steven. Lizzy is Samantha's sister, a recovering alcoholic who helps run the catering business and is unaware of what the Blooms are really up to. The Blooms are unaware that Shaw has a secret agenda for reactivating them.

Production
On May 3, 2010 Undercovers was officially ordered to series by NBC for a fall premiere, Wednesdays at 8/7c. Undercovers premiered on Wednesday, September 22, making it the second spy series produced by Alias executive producer Abrams.

Abrams directed the Undercovers pilot; it was the first time he had directed a pilot since 2004's Lost premiere and the first episode of television he has directed since a 2007 episode of The Office. Abrams said of the show, "This show does have ongoing stories as well but they are much more personal based and character based. But I'm trying to do a show that has a more fun energy and a little more [comedy]..." And on his decision to direct the pilot, Abrams explained that "I just enjoyed the idea of it. I enjoy the script… I enjoyed the chemistry of these two people and it became clear as we were working on it, rather than be sitting on the set every day with someone else directing it, being annoying, I'd rather just take the burden on myself."

The show has been described as a "stand-alone adventure every week" and a "modernized Hart to Hart", although Abrams announced just before its cancellation that the show would be starting a serialized storyline concerning the true reasons for the Blooms' reactivation.

On November 4, 2010, after weeks of poor viewership and ratings, NBC canceled the series. The show's final three episodes aired in December 2010. Two episodes remain unaired, but NBC has no plans to broadcast them in the immediate future. Warner Home Video has not yet announced if the complete series will be released on DVD and/or Blu-ray. As of December 2020, all 13 episodes are currently available to watch free with ads on the streaming service Tubi.

In May 2011, all 13 episodes of the first season were premiered in the UK on Virgin Media as an On Demand program by WarnerTV.

In an interview, Abrams talked about the failure of the show:"I've got to say, I feel like it was unfortunate. Of course, I completely blame myself for the entire thing. The conceit of the show was to do a much more frivolous, fun show, but ultimately, I think it was just too frivolous and too simple, and we didn't go deep enough. We were really desperately trying to stay away from mythology and complexity and intensity and too much serious, dark storytelling and, ultimately, that's not necessarily what I do best. I think audiences felt that it was a little bit lacking. I see that and completely take responsibility for its failing".

In retrospect, Undercovers did end up employing a notable writing staff, many of whom have gone on to become successful head writers and Showrunners of other shows (Karin Gist, Showrunner of Star and Mixed-ish; Anthony Sparks, Showrunner of the Ava DuVernay created Queen Sugar; Elwood Reid, Showrunner of The Bridge; and Phil Klemmer, Showrunner of Legends of Tomorrow.

Cast
 Gugu Mbatha-Raw as Samantha Bloom
 Boris Kodjoe as Steven Bloom
 Ben Schwartz as Bill Hoyt
 Mekia Cox as Lizzy Gilliam
 Carter MacIntyre as Leo Nash
 Gerald McRaney as Carlton Shaw

Episodes

References

External links
 
 

2010s American drama television series
2010 American television series debuts
2010 American television series endings
American action television series
Television series by Bad Robot Productions
English-language television shows
Espionage television series
NBC original programming
Television series about the Central Intelligence Agency
Television series by Warner Bros. Television Studios
Television series created by J. J. Abrams
American spy thriller television series